The Toyota Progrès (pronounced "Prog-Ray") is a mid-size luxury sedan which was sold in Japan from May 1998 to June 2007, replacing the Toyota Corona EXiV. The Progrès included 2.5 L or 3.0 L JZ inline 6-cylinder engines with VVT-i. Since April 2001, the Progrès used 1JZ-FSE (2.5 L) and 2JZ-FSE (3.0 L) direct injection (D4) engines. The versions with a 1JZ engine were called NC250, and those with a 2JZ engine NC300. It was exclusive to Toyota Japan dealerships Toyopet Store, while its twin the Brevis was exclusive to Toyota Store locations, and shared a marketing approach used on the Toyota Vista Store alternative, called the Toyota Verossa. The width and engine displacement exceed Japanese Government regulations concerning exterior dimensions and engine displacement, and therefore it classified in the larger "passenger car" tax bracket. Two engine sizes were offered to allow Japanese buyers which annual road tax they were willing to pay; the larger engine did offer higher levels of standard equipment and luxury features.

The name "progrès" is French for "progress".

The Progrès was available with 6 airbags, voice activated GPS system called G-Book, NAVI AI-SHIFT world first GPS-guided car transmission (mechanics), full wood and leather trim, gilt or silver analogue clock and full soft touch plastic interior, dual zone air conditioning and automatic head lights and wipers. Interior size was also generous, offering the best cu. ft. of space in its class, despite its Lexus IS underpinnings – yet, unlike the Lexus IS, the ride was "willing and ready" rather than the sort of ride expected from a sport sedan, as it was installed with double wishbone suspension at both the front and rear wheels.

The Progrès was discontinued in Japan in June 2007, while the slightly smaller Toyota Premio continued as an affordable luxury car offering.

See also 
 Toyota Brevis

References

External links 
 Official 

Progres
Luxury vehicles
Cars introduced in 1998

2000s cars